Challhua (possibly from Quechua for "fish"), Wiksu or Huicsu (both names possibly from Quechua for "twisted, bent") is a mountain in the southern Cordillera Blanca in the Andes of Peru, about  high (IGN Peru map cites an elevation of ). Challhua is located in the Ancash Region, Bolognesi Province, Aquia District and in the Recuay Province, Catac District. It is situated northeast of Caullaraju, west of Pastu Ruri and Tuco and south of Santun. One of the nearest places is the village of Wicso, located next to Callan creek, west of the mountain. This creek flows to the Pumapampa River, a right affluent of the Santa River.

Sources 

Mountains of Peru
Mountains of Ancash Region